West Overton is located approximately  southeast of Pittsburgh, in East Huntingdon Township, Westmoreland County, Pennsylvania, United States. It is on PA 819 between the towns of Mount Pleasant and Scottdale. Its latitude is 40.117N and its longitude is -79.564W.

It has long been known as the birthplace of Henry Clay Frick, the industrialist and art collector, and the original site of distillery of his great-grandfather Henry Overholt and grandfather Abraham Overholt, the namesake of Old Overholt rye whiskey.

West Overton Village was established in 1800 by German Mennonites from Bucks County, who were led by Henry Overholt. Today it operates as a museum complex and is an example of a 19th-century rural industrial village. It is the only pre-American Civil War village still intact in Pennsylvania.

The museum has undergone a complete renovation and will focus on the Overholt industries of whiskey distillation, grist milling and coal and coke operations.  The museum was scheduled to reopen for tours in August 2012 with the Overholt Homestead to reopen in June 2013.

West Overton Historic District
West Overton Historic District is a national historic district located at East Huntingdon Township, Westmoreland County, Pennsylvania. It encompasses 19 contributing buildings in the village of West Overton.  They are a collection of mid-19th century buildings in a vernacular Greek Revival style. It includes the Christian S. Overholt Store and House, Abraham Overholt Homestead (1838), and Overholt Mill (1859).  The springhouse of the Abraham Overholt Homestead is the birthplace of Henry Clay Frick (1849-1919).

It was added to the National Register of Historic Places in 1985.

References

External links
West Overton Museums website
Frick Art & Historical Center website
All of the following Historic American Buildings Survey (HABS) records are filed under West Overton, Westmoreland County, PA:

Historic American Buildings Survey in Pennsylvania
Historic districts on the National Register of Historic Places in Pennsylvania
Greek Revival houses in Pennsylvania
Buildings and structures in Westmoreland County, Pennsylvania
Museums in Westmoreland County, Pennsylvania
Ghost towns in Pennsylvania
Open-air museums in Pennsylvania
National Register of Historic Places in Westmoreland County, Pennsylvania
Populated places on the National Register of Historic Places in Pennsylvania